Serafino Cerva (1696–1759), also known as Saro, was the author of Ragusan Library, the first encyclopedia in the Dalmatian language, which comprised 435 biographies of ancient men and of the "Athens of the Adriatic" (Ragusa). He translated some minor local literary works into Italian. He belonged to the Cerva family.

See also 
 List of notable Ragusans

References

Further reading 

1696 births
1759 deaths
Ragusan historians
People from the Republic of Ragusa
18th-century Italian historians